Zülpicher See (also Wassersportsee Zülpich) is a lake in Zülpich, North Rhine-Westphalia, Germany. At an elevation of 154 m, its surface area is 85 ha.

Lakes of North Rhine-Westphalia